Grégory Tony (born 27 May 1978) is a French heavyweight kickboxer and professional boxer fighting out of Paris. He is three time French kickboxing champion, three time French muaythai champion, one time French boxing champion, two time European kickboxing champion, one time Intercontinental muaythai champion and two time muaythai world champion.

Biography and career
On April 7, 2012 he faced Igor Mihaljevic for vacant W.A.K.O. Pro heavyweight title, he won the title by knockout in fourth round with numerous low kicks.

He faced Igor Jurkovic at Glory 2: Brussels on October 6, 2012 in Brussels, Belgium and lost via TKO due to body shots in the second round.

As the W.K.N. World K-1 Rules Super-Heavyweight title bout in Draguignan, France on June 14, 2014 against Alex Rossi was canceled due to heavy rain floods, Gregory fought for the W.K.N. World Title but against Dmytro Bezus on October 18, 2014. Beating Bezus on points he became first W.K.N. super-heavyweight K-1 rules champion of the world. On 13 December 2014 in Dombasle, France he defended his W.K.N. title by KO win in Round 2 against Serbian Milan Dasic. On March 26, 2016 in Guadeloupe, Caribbean, he will be fighting Jiri Stariat from Czech Republic in his second W.K.N. title defense.

Tony fought Bob Sapp in the main event at Fight Night Saint Tropez on August 4, 2017 and won by TKO in the first round.

Titles

Kickboxing
 2014 WKN World K-1 Rules Super-Heavyweight Champion +96,6 kg (3 Title Def.)
 2012 WAKO Pro World Low-Kick Rules Super-Heavyweight champion +94.2 kg
 2008 King Of The Ring of KO World Series in Auckland
 2007 K-1 Rules Kick Tournament in Marseilles runner up
 2006 K-1 Canarias runner up
 2006 I.S.K.A. Intercontinental Freestyle Rules champion
 2005 K-1 France Grand Prix in Marseilles runner up
 2003 K-1 World Grand Prix Preliminary France champion
 2002 K-1 World Grand Prix Preliminary Marseilles champion
 2001 WIKDF Drakka Fight Intercontinental Kickboxing champion
 2000 WPKA European champion
 2000 WPKA Amateur European Kickboxing champion
 2000 French Kickboxing champion
 1996 French Kickboxing champion
 1995 French Kickboxing champion

Muaythai
 2005 WKBC World Muaythai champion (1 Title Defense)
 2000 French Muaythai champion
 1999 French Muaythai champion
 1996 French Muaythai champion

Professional boxing
 2009 French Boxing champion
 2008 French Boxing Heavyweight Tournament champion

Fight record

|- 
|-  bgcolor="#CCFFCC"
| 2018-08-04|| Win ||align=left| Frédéric Sinistra ||Fight Night Saint Tropez 6  ||  Saint Tropez, France || TKO  || 2 ||
|- 
|-  bgcolor="#CCFFCC"
| 2018-06-23|| Win ||align=left| Bresko Bence ||Gala Du Phenix Muaythai  || France || KO  || 2 ||
|- 
|-  bgcolor="#CCFFCC"
| 2017-08-04 || Win ||align=left| Bob Sapp ||Fight Night Saint-Tropez  || France || TKO (Punches) || 1 ||
|- 
|-  bgcolor="#CCFFCC"
| 2016-11-11 || Win ||align=left| Alexandr Soldatkin || Tatneft Cup 2016 final || Kazan, Russia || Decision (Unanimous) || 4 || 3:00
|-
|-  bgcolor="#CCFFCC"
| 2016-06-09 || Win ||align=left| Alen Kapetanovic || Gwada Super Fight  || Guadeloupe, Caribbean Islands || KO (High kick) || 2 || 
|-
! style=background:white colspan=9 |
|- 
|-  bgcolor="#FFBBBB"
| 2016-04-26 || Loss ||align=left| Hesdy Gerges || It's Hardcore Time Again 2  || Meppen, Germany || TKO || 1 || 3:00
|-
! style=background:white colspan=9 |
|- 
|-  bgcolor="#CCFFCC"
| 2015-07-25 || Win ||align=left| Yannick Vest || Choc des Gladiateurs  || Le Lavandou, France || KO || 3 || 
|-
! style=background:white colspan=9 |
|- 
|-  bgcolor="#CCFFCC"
| 2015-07-04 || Win ||align=left| Panagiotis Diakos || Dragui Super Fight Night || Draguignan, France || KO (Flying knee)  || 2 || 
|-
|-  bgcolor="#CCFFCC"
| 2014-12-13 || Win ||align=left| Milan Dašić || La Nuit des Sports de Combats  || Dombasle-sur-Meurthe, France || KO || 2 || 
|-
! style=background:white colspan=9 |
|- 
|-  bgcolor="#CCFFCC"
| 2014-10-18 || Win ||align=left| Dmytro Bezus || Choc Fight Night || Draguignan, France ||  Decision (Unanimous) || 5 || 3:00
|-
! style=background:white colspan=9 |
|- 
|-  bgcolor="#FFBBBB"
| 2012-10-06 || Loss ||align=left| Igor Jurković || Glory 2: Brussels || Brussels, Belgium || TKO (Ref Stop/3 Knockdowns) || 2 || 
|-
|-  bgcolor="#CCFFCC"
| 2012-04-07 || Win ||align=left| Igor Mihaljevic || K1 Rules World Championship || Sainte-Maxime, France || TKO (Lowkicks) || 4 || 
|-
! style=background:white colspan=9 |
|-
|-  bgcolor="#FFBBBB"
| 2011-05-14 || Loss ||align=left| Badr Hari || It's Showtime 2011 Lyon || Lyon, France || TKO (Ref Stop/3 Knockdowns) || 1 || 2:43
|-
|-  bgcolor="#c5d2ea"
| 2009-12-18 || Draw ||align=left| Fabrice Aurieng || Trophée Bad Panther || Stade Michel Volnay, Réunion || Decision Draw || 5 || 3:00
|-
! style=background:white colspan=9 |
|-
|-  bgcolor="#CCFFCC"
| 2008-09-27 || Win ||align=left| Francois Botha || WFC 6 || Sofia, Bulgaria || Decision || 3 || 3:00
|-
|-  bgcolor="#CCFFCC"
| 2008-02-09 || Win ||align=left| Stipan Radic || KO World Series 2008 Auckland, Final || Auckland, New Zealand || KO (punches) || 1 || 
|-
! style=background:white colspan=9 |
|-
|-  bgcolor="#CCFFCC"
| 2008-02-09 || Win ||align=left| Alexey Ignashov || KO World Series 2008 Auckland, Semi Final || Auckland, New Zealand || Decision (Unanimous) || 3 || 3:00
|-
|-  bgcolor="#FFBBBB"
| 2007-01-26 || Loss ||align=left| Zabit Samedov || K-1 Rules Kick Tournament 2007 in Marseilles, Final || Marseilles, France || KO || 3 || 2:30
|-
! style=background:white colspan=9 |
|-
|-  bgcolor="#CCFFCC"
| 2007-01-26 || Win ||align=left| Mark Bos || K-1 Rules Kick Tournament 2007 in Marseilles, Semi Final || Marseilles, France || TKO (knees) || 2 || 
|-
|-  bgcolor="#CCFFCC"
| 2007-01-26 || Win ||align=left| Daniele Petroni || K-1 Rules Kick Tournament 2007 in Marseilles, Quarter Final || Marseilles, France || KO (high kick) || 1 || 
|-
|-  bgcolor="#FFBBBB"
| 2006-12-16 || Loss ||align=left| Daniel Ghiţă || Local Kombat 24 "Bataie în Giulesti" || Bucharest, Romania || KO (Right hook) || 2 || 2:09
|-
|-  bgcolor="#FFBBBB"
| 2006-06-17 || Loss ||align=left| Rodney Faverus || K-1 Canarias 2006, Final || Santa Cruz de Tenerife, Spain || TKO (knees and punches) || 1 || 
|-
! style=background:white colspan=9 |
|-
|-  bgcolor="#CCFFCC"
| 2006-06-17 || Win ||align=left| Venevicius Vaidotas || K-1 Canarias 2006, Semi Final || Santa Cruz de Tenerife, Spain || Decision || 3 || 3:00
|-
|-  bgcolor="#CCFFCC"
| 2006-06-17 || Win ||align=left| Errol Zimmerman || K-1 Canarias 2006, Quarter Final || Santa Cruz de Tenerife, Spain || Decision (Unanimous) || 3 || 3:00
|-
|-  bgcolor="#CCFFCC"
| 2006-03-10 || Win ||align=left| Daniel Ghiţă || Local Kombat 19 "Înfruntarea titanilor" || Iaşi, Romania || KO (Right high kick) || 1 || 
|-
|-  bgcolor="#CCFFCC"
| 2005-11-26 || Win ||align=left| Patrice Quarteron || La Nuit des Champions || Marseilles, France || Decision (Unanimous) || 5 || 2:00
|-
! style=background:white colspan=9 |
|-
|-  bgcolor="#FFBBBB"
| 2005-10-29 || Loss ||align=left| Gary Turner || K-1 New Talents 2005 in Germany || Koblenz, Germany || TKO (Corner Stoppage) || 3 || 3:00
|-
|-  bgcolor="#CCFFCC"
| 2005-05-27 || Win ||align=left| Petar Majstorovic || K-1 World Grand Prix 2005 in Paris || Paris, France || Decision (Unanimous) || 3 || 3:00
|-
|-  bgcolor="#CCFFCC"
| 2005-05-06 || Win ||align=left| Evgeny Orlov || K-1 Slovakia 2005 || Bratislava, Slovakia || Decision || 3 || 3:00
|-
|-  bgcolor="#FFBBBB"
| 2005-04-16 || Loss ||align=left| Alexander Ustinov || K-1 Italy 2005 Oktagon, Semi Final || Milan, Italy || Decision (Unanimous) || 3 || 3:00
|-
|-  bgcolor="#CCFFCC"
| 2005-04-16 || Win ||align=left| Sergei Gur || K-1 Italy 2005 Oktagon, Quarter Final || Milan, Italy || Decision || 3 || 3:00
|-
|-  bgcolor="#CCFFCC"
| 2005-03-12 || Win ||align=left| Vitali Akhramenko ||  || France || Decision (Unanimous) || 3 || 3:00
|-
|-  bgcolor="#FFBBBB"
| 2005-01-29 || Loss ||align=left| Christian Nka || K-1 France Grand Prix 2005 in Marseilles, Final || Marseilles, France || Decision || 3 || 3:00
|-
! style=background:white colspan=9 |
|-
|-  bgcolor="#CCFFCC"
| 2005-01-29 || Win ||align=left| Ruslan Avasov || K-1 France Grand Prix 2005 in Marseilles, Semi Final || Marseilles, France || Decision || 3 || 3:00
|-
|-  bgcolor="#CCFFCC"
| 2005-01-29 || Win ||align=left| Matthias Riccio || K-1 France Grand Prix 2005 in Marseilles, Quarter Final || Marseilles, France || TKO || 2 || 
|-
|-  bgcolor="#CCFFCC"
| 2004-08-19 || Win ||align=left| Peter Varga || K-1 Grand Prix Hungary || Debrecen, Hungary || Decision || 3 || 3:00
|-
|-  bgcolor="#CCFFCC"
| 2004-04-24 || Win ||align=left| Pelé Reid || Pain and Glory || Birmingham, England || Decision || 3 || 3:00
|-
|-  bgcolor="#FFBBBB"
| 2004-01-24 || Loss ||align=left| Humberto Evora || K-1 Marseilles 2004 World Qualification, Semi Final || Marseilles, France || Decision (Split) || 3 || 3:00
|-
|-  bgcolor="#CCFFCC"
| 2004-01-24 || Win ||align=left| Zsolt Lekner || K-1 Marseilles 2004 World Qualification, Quarter Final || Marseilles, France || TKO || 3 || 1:00
|-
|-  bgcolor="#FFBBBB"
| 2003-06-14 || Loss ||align=left| Alexander Ustinov || K-1 World Grand Prix 2003 in Paris, Quarter Final || Paris, France || KO (Low kicks) || 2 || 2:40
|-
|-  bgcolor="#CCFFCC"
| 2003-01-24 || Win ||align=left| Azem Maksutaj || K-1 World Grand Prix 2003 Preliminary France, Final || Marseilles, France || Decision (Unanimous) || 3 || 3:00
|-
! style=background:white colspan=9 |
|-
|-  bgcolor="#CCFFCC"
| 2003-01-24 || Win ||align=left| Fabrice Bernardin || K-1 World Grand Prix 2003 Preliminary France, Semi Final || Marseilles, France || KO || 2 || 0:59
|-
|-  bgcolor="#CCFFCC"
| 2003-01-24 || Win ||align=left| Daniel Waciakowski || K-1 World Grand Prix 2003 Preliminary France, Quarter Final || Marseilles, France || Decision (Unanimous) || 3 || 3:00
|-
|-  bgcolor="#FFBBBB"
| 2002-08-17 || Loss ||align=left| Michael McDonald || K-1 World Grand Prix 2002 in Las Vegas, Semi Final || Las Vegas, Nevada, USA || Decision (Unanimous) || 3 || 3:00
|-
|-  bgcolor="#CCFFCC"
| 2002-08-17 || Win ||align=left| Petr Vondracek || K-1 World Grand Prix 2002 in Las Vegas, Quarter Final || Las Vegas, Nevada, USA || KO || 1 || 2:48
|-
|-  bgcolor="#CCFFCC"
| 2002-05-25 || Win ||align=left| Azem Maksutaj || K-1 World Grand Prix 2002 in Paris || Paris, France || Majority Decision (2-0) || 5 || 3:00
|-
|-  bgcolor="#CCFFCC"
| 2002-01-25 || Win ||align=left| Azem Maksutaj || K-1 World Grand Prix 2002 in Marseilles, Final || Marseilles, France || Majority Decision (2-0) || 3 || 3:00
|-
! style=background:white colspan=9 |
|-
|-  bgcolor="#CCFFCC"
| 2002-01-25 || Win ||align=left| Philippe Gomis || K-1 World Grand Prix 2002 in Marseilles, Semi Final || Marseilles, France || KO || 1 || 2:57
|-
|-  bgcolor="#CCFFCC"
| 2002-01-25 || Win ||align=left| Karim Aouaden || K-1 World Grand Prix 2002 in Marseilles, Quarter Final || Marseilles, France || KO || 1 || 0:50
|-
|-  bgcolor="#CCFFCC"
| 2001-06-09 || Win ||align=left| Jörgen Kruth || K-1 World Grand Prix 2001 Preliminary Scandinavia || Copenhagen, Denmark || Disqualification || 3 || 2:38
|-

|-  bgcolor=""#ffbbbb"
|-  bgcolor="#ffbbbb"
|-  bgcolor="#CCFFCC"
| 2007-05-12 || Win ||align=left| Alessandro de Oliveira || Knock Out Championship 1 || Cognac, France || Submission (Neck Crank) || 2 || 2:46 || 1–0–0
|-

|-  bgcolor="#FFBBBB"
| 2014-03-29 || Loss ||align=left| Mickael Vieira ||  || Montlucon, France || MD || 8 || || 20–6
|-  bgcolor="#FFBBBB"
| 2014-01-30 || Loss ||align=left| Newfel Ouatah ||  || Rillieux-la-Pape, France || KO || 4 || || 20–5
|-
! style=background:white colspan=9 |
|-
|-  bgcolor="#CCFFCC"
| 2013-12-07 || Win ||align=left| Jean Francois Traore ||  || Dombasle-sur-Meurthe, France || TKO || 3 ||  || 20–4
|-  bgcolor="#CCFFCC"
| 2013-05-24 || Win ||align=left| Rio Hidaka ||  || Osaka, Japan || UD || 8 || 3:00 || 19–4
|-  bgcolor="#FFBBBB"
| 2013-03-15 || Loss ||align=left| Fabrice Aurieng ||  || Yutz, France || TD (Injury) || 5 || || 18–4
|-
! style=background:white colspan=9 |
|-
|-  bgcolor="#CCFFCC"
| 2012-12-08 || Win ||align=left| Tomas Mrazek ||  || Dombasle-sur-Meurthe, France || PTS || 8 || 3:00 || 18–3
|-  bgcolor="#FFBBBB"
| 2012-06-16 || Loss ||align=left| Richard Towers || Boxing Gala at Velodrome || Manchester, England || TKO || 9 || || 17–3
|-
! style=background:white colspan=9 |
|-
|-  bgcolor="#CCFFCC"
| 2011-12-10 || Win ||align=left| Maksym Pedyura || Boxing Gala at Salle Roger Boileau || Dombasle-sur-Meurthe, France || KO || 2 ||  || 17–2
|-  bgcolor="#CCFFCC"
| 2011-10-01 || Win ||align=left| Ferenc Zsalek || Boxing Gala at Salle Mermoz || Yutz, France || TKO || 1 ||  || 16–2
|-  bgcolor="#FFBBBB"
| 2011-05-07 || Loss ||align=left| Mike Perez || Prizefighter Tournament International, Semi Final || London, England || TKO || 1 || || 15–2
|-  bgcolor="#CCFFCC"
| 2011-05-07 || Win ||align=left| Evgeny Orlov || Prizefighter Tournament International, Quarter Final || London, England || Decision (Split) || 3 || 3:00 || 15–1
|-  bgcolor="#CCFFCC"
| 2011-04-16 || Win ||align=left| Paata Berikashvili || Salle des fêtes || Villerupt, France || TKO (Referee Stoppage) || 2 || || 14–1
|-  bgcolor="#CCFFCC"
| 2011-03-12 || Win ||align=left| Pavel Dolgovs || Salle Mermoz || Metz, France || KO || 4 || || 13–1
|-  bgcolor="#FFBBBB"
| 2010-08-21 || Loss ||align=left| Robert Helenius || Messehalle || Erfurt, Germany || TKO || 6 || || 12–1
|-
! style=background:white colspan=9 |
|-
|-  bgcolor="#CCFFCC"
| 2009-09-10 || Win ||align=left| Edgars Kalnars || Cirque d'hiver || Paris, France || TKO || 3 || || 12–0
|-  bgcolor="#CCFFCC"
| 2009-06-27 || Win ||align=left| Carlos Takam || La Palestre || Le Cannet, France || Decision (Unanimous) || 8 || || 11–0
|-  bgcolor="#CCFFCC"
| 2009-04-23 || Win ||align=left| Marouan Larouiche || Cirque d'Hiver || Paris, France || Decision (Unanimous) || 10 || || 10–0
|-
! style=background:white colspan=9 |
|-
|-  bgcolor="#CCFFCC"
| 2008-12-11 || Win ||align=left| Zinedine Benmakhouf || Cirque d'Hiver || Paris, France || TKO || 1 || || 9–0
|-  bgcolor="#CCFFCC"
| 2008-06-05 || Win ||align=left| Daniil Peretyatko || Cirque d'Hiver || Paris, France || TKO || 4 || || 8–0
|-  bgcolor="#CCFFCC"
| 2008-04-19 || Win ||align=left| Leo Sanchez || Salle des fetes || Villerupt, France || TKO || 3 || || 7–0
|-  bgcolor="#CCFFCC"
| 2008-03-08 || Win ||align=left| Cyril Leonet || Palais des sports St Symphorien || Metz, France || KO || 1 || || 6–0
|-  bgcolor="#CCFFCC"
| 2008-01-05 || Win ||align=left| Marin Gălăţeanu || Marmoutier || Bas-Rhin, France || KO || 2 || || 5–0
|-  bgcolor="#CCFFCC"
| 2007-12-01 || Win ||align=left| Francesco Rosselli || Salle Roger Boileau || Meurthe-et-Moselle, France || KO || 1 || || 4–0
|-  bgcolor="#CCFFCC"
| 2007-05-26 || Win ||align=left| Ion Voica || Salle Roger Boileau || Meurthe-et-Moselle, France || KO || 1 || || 3–0
|-  bgcolor="#CCFFCC"
| 2007-04-28 || Win ||align=left| Emmanuel Marc || Salle de l'Hotel de Ville || Villerupt, France || KO || 1 || || 2–0
|-  bgcolor="#CCFFCC"
| 2006-12-09 || Win ||align=left| Pavel Virgil || Dombasle-sur-Meurthe || Meurthe-et-Moselle, France || TKO || 1 || || 1–0
|-
| colspan=9 | Legend:

See also
List of K-1 events
List of male kickboxers
Muay Thai
Boxing

References

External links
Profile at K-1

1978 births
Living people
French male kickboxers
Heavyweight kickboxers
French Muay Thai practitioners
French male boxers
French male mixed martial artists
Mixed martial artists utilizing boxing
Mixed martial artists utilizing kickboxing
Mixed martial artists utilizing Muay Thai
SUPERKOMBAT kickboxers